Mr World Mexico refers to the pageant title given to the Mexican men chosen to represent Mexico at the international male beauty pageant Mister World. The nation has taken part in every edition of Mister World ever since its establishment in 1996, debut year in which Mexico's Gabriel Soto placed second (first runner-up) — the highest placement achieved by a Mexican contestant in that event to this day.

As of 2016, the Miss Mexico Organization is in charge of making the selection of the country's delegate to Mister World, generally occurring every year the (usually biannual) global competition takes place. Lupita Jones and the Nuestra Belleza México organization previously held the Mister World franchise in Mexico (from 1996 to 2016) and dubbed the national contest as El Modelo México, literally The (male) Model Mexico.

Winners
Below are the names of the Mr World Mexico titleholders (known as El Modelo Mexico from 1996 to 2014), their state of origin and their final placements in Mister World after their participation, all in ascending order.

Color key

By state wins

 Mister World was postponed that year, therefore delegate could not compete.
 The original titleholder Alejandro Valencia was replaced due a motorcycle accident from which recovery time interfered with his participation.

See also
Nuestra Belleza México

External links
Modelo Mexico 2006

Mexico
Mexican awards
Beauty pageants in Mexico
Recurring events established in 1996